Bury Castle was an early medieval moated manor house in Bury, Lancashire. Its remains are listed as a Scheduled Ancient Monument. The manor house was built by Sir Thomas Pilkington – lord of the manors of Bury and Pilkington, and an influential member of Lancashire's gentry – in 1469. He was given permission by Edward IV to:  It is situated on the top of a slope overlooking the River Irwell in a strong defensive position. Excavations have revealed there were six main construction phases on the site. The first phase was between 1359 and 1400 and produced a house platform surrounded by a moat. The building was razed to the ground (slighted) on the orders of Henry VII after Sir Thomas Pilkington supported the House of York in the Wars of the Roses, particularly the Battle of Bosworth in 1485. On top of this, all of Sir Thomas' lands were confiscated.

In 1540, antiquary John Leland described Bury Castle as "a ruin of a castle by the Parish Church in the town". The ruins were looted to provide building material for the town of Bury.

The remains of Bury Castle drew public attention in 1973 when amateur archaeologists uncovered stonework that had previously lain underneath a car park. The site, which is owned by Bury council and has undergone "restoration and enhancement work", has been open to the public since 2000.

See also
Castles in Greater Manchester
Scheduled Monuments in Greater Manchester

References

Buildings and structures completed in 1469
Castles in Lancashire
Buildings and structures in Bury, Greater Manchester
Scheduled monuments in Greater Manchester
Ruins in Greater Manchester
Ruined castles in England
1469 establishments in England